Daniel N. Baker (born 1947) is an American space scientist. He is the Distinguished Professor of Astrophysical and Planetary Science at the University of Colorado Boulder and director of the Laboratory for Atmospheric and Space Physics. He received his B.A. from the University of Iowa in 1969 and his Ph.D. from the same institution in 1974. In 2010 he was elected to the National Academy of Engineering for "leadership in studies, measurements, and predictive tools for the Earth's radiation environment and its impact on U.S. security."

See also
 Space weather
 Rare events

References

External links
 Faculty webpage

University of Iowa alumni
People from Colorado
Living people
1947 births
University of Colorado Boulder faculty
American astrophysicists
Members of the United States National Academy of Engineering